Veli Sadiki (born 7 March 1984) is a Macedonian racing cyclist. He rode at the 2014 UCI Road World Championships.

Major results
2013
 2nd National Road Race Championships
2014
 1st  National Time Trial Championships

References

External links
 

1984 births
Living people
Macedonian male cyclists
Place of birth missing (living people)